Alice Christiana Gertrude Meynell (née Thompson; 11 October 184727 November 1922) was a British writer, editor, critic, and suffragist, now remembered mainly as a poet.

Early years and family
Alice Christiana Gertrude Thompson was born in Barnes, London, to Thomas James and Christiana (née Weller) Thompson. The family moved around England, Switzerland, and France, but she was brought up mostly in Italy, where a daughter of Thomas from his first marriage had settled. Her father was a friend of Charles Dickens, and Meynell suggests in her memoir that Dickens was also romantically interested in her mother, noting that he had said to Thomas Thompson, "Good God, what a madman I should seem if the incredible feeling I have conceived for that girl could be made plain to anyone!"

Alice married five-years junior Wilfrid Meynell (1852-1948) in 1877, had eight children, Sebastian, Monica, Everard (1882–1926), Madeleine, Viola, Vivian (who died at three months), Olivia, and Francis. Viola Meynell (1885–1956) became a writer, known mainly for fiction, and the youngest child Francis Meynell (1891–1975) became a poet and a printer who co-founded The Nonesuch Press.

Career and writing
Preludes (1875) was her first poetry collection, illustrated by her elder sister Elizabeth (the artist Lady Elizabeth Butler (1846–1933) whose husband was Sir William Francis Butler). The work was warmly praised by Ruskin, although it received little public notice. Ruskin especially singled out the sonnet "Renouncement" for its beauty and delicacy.

After Alice converted whilst recuperating from one of her frequent illnesses, and she had written love poetry like After a parting and Renouncement for the young Jesuit priest who guided her to faith, Father Augustus Dignam, the entire Thompson family converted to the Catholic Church (1868 to 1880), and her writings migrated to subjects of religious matters. This eventually led her to the Catholic newspaper publisher and editor Wilfrid Meynell (1852–1948) in 1876, whom she married the next year (1877) and they settled in Kensington. They became the proprietors and editors of such magazines as The Pen, the Weekly Register, and Merry England, among others.

Meynell was much involved in editorial work on publications with her husband, and in her own writing, poetry and prose. She wrote regularly for The World, The Spectator, The Magazine of Art, the Scots Observer (which became the National Observer, both edited by W. E. Henley), The Tablet, The Art Journal, the Pall Mall Gazette, and The Saturday Review. Her poems show her feminist concerns as well as her reactions to the events of World War I.

The poet Francis Thompson, down and out in London and trying to recover from his opium addiction, sent the couple a manuscript. His poems were first published in Wilfrid's Merry England, and the Meynells became a supporter of Thompson. His 1893 book Poems was a Meynell production and initiative. Another supporter of Thompson was the poet Coventry Patmore. Alice had a deep friendship with Patmore, lasting several years, which led to his becoming obsessed with her, forcing her to break with him. She wrote the article on Patmore for the Catholic Encyclopedia.

At the end of the 19th century, in conjunction with uprisings against the British (among them the Indians', the Zulus', the Boxer Rebellion, and the Muslim revolt led by Muhammad Ahmed in the Sudan), many European scholars, writers, and artists, began to question Europe's colonial imperialism. This led the Meynells and others in their circle to speak out for the oppressed. Alice Meynell was a vice-president of the Women Writers' Suffrage League, founded by Cicely Hamilton and active 1908–19.

Meynell was one of the early founders of the Catholic women's organisation, Catholic Women's Suffrage Society in support of peaceful means for the achievement of equal suffrage rights for women. Meynell established and wrote in the first edition of its newspaper The Catholic Suffragist, in 1915, that 'a Catholic suffragist woman is a graver suffragist on graver grounds and with weightier reasons than any other suffragist in England (sic)'.... Surely England has endured too long what is not only immodest but profoundly immoral, reports were shared from eleven branches (including a national congress in Wales and two societies in Scotland) and the editorial said 'We dare to say that if the balance of power between men and women had been more equal the world over, we should not still be settling international disputes by swamping a continent in blood and turning Europe into a shambles. Meynell wrote in The Tablet against Father Henry Day who in Liverpool and Manchester preached against votes for women risking 'bringing a revolution of the first magnitude'. Meynell retorted 'I say, most gravely, the vaster the magnitude of the revolution, the better.'  Where Day saw 'danger' Meynell saw a 'fortress of safety' for Catholic women, and she saw anti-suffrage rhetoric as 'insolence'.

Death and legacy
Meynell was twice considered for the Poet Laureate of the United Kingdom, on the 1892 death of Alfred, Lord Tennyson and in 1913 to replace Alfred Austin. Elizabeth Barrett Browning, her third cousin, was the only other female potential laureate up to that time. Neither of these women were given the recognition of this status with the first and only female to hold that honorary post, appointed by the monarch, being Carol Ann Duffy in 2009 -19.

After a series of illnesses, including migraine and depression, Meynell died on 27 November 1922 aged 75.  A posthumous collection of her Last Poems was published by Burns and Oates, a year later. Meynell is buried at Kensal Green Catholic Cemetery in London. There is a London County Council commemorative blue plaque on the front wall of the property at 47 Palace Court, Bayswater, London, W2, where she and her husband once lived.

Selected works

Preludes (1875) – poems
The Rhythm of Life and Other Essays (1893)
Poems by Francis Thompson (1893) – editor and producer
Holman Hunt (1893)
Selected Poems of Thomas Gordon Hake (1894) – editor

The Poetry of Pathos & Delight by Coventry Patmore (1896) – editor
The Flower of the Mind (1897) – anthology of English verse, editor, critic

London Impressions (1898)
John Ruskin (1900)
Later Poems (1902)
The Work of John S. Sargent (1903)
Ceres' Runaway and Other Essays (1909)
Childhood (1913)
Essays (1914)
Hearts of Controversy (1917)
The Second Person Singular and Other Essays (1921)
The Poems of Alice Meynell: Complete Edition (Oxford University Press, 1940)
The Poems of Alice Meynell: Centenary Edition (London: Hollis and Carter, 1947) 
Prose and Poetry (Jonathan Cape, 1947) – multiple editors, centenary publication with a biography and critical introduction by Vita Sackville-West
The latter publication is catalogued by one WorldCat library as Prose and Poetry of A. Meynell, 1847–1922 (OCLC 219753450) and by one as Alice Meynell: Prose and Poetry. Centenary Volume (OCLC 57050918), while another reports a 2007 facsimile edition Prose and Poetry, 1847–1922. There may be the title of a 1970 issue as Prose and Poetry, .

See also

History of feminism
List of suffragists and suffragettes
Women's suffrage in the United Kingdom

References

Citations:

External links

 "The Poems of Alice Meynell (1923)" at Poetry.elcore.net
 Essays by Alice Meynell at Quotidiana.org
 
 
 
 "Alice Meynell: Poet of Poets, 1847–1922" at the University of Virginia
 Index entry at Poets' Corner
 
 {{cite book|last1=Mahar|first1=Aileen R |title=Contemporary criticism, personal and literary, of Alice Meynell (Master's thesis) |date=1946 |publisher=Boston University |url=https://archive.org/stream/contemporarycrit00maha#page/n2/mode/1up|access-date=1 March 2017}}
 Alice Meynell collection at Boston College
 
 Everard Meynell (son) at LC Authorities, with 4 records including that of The Life of Francis Thompson'' (1913)
Alice Meynell at the Academy of American Poets
Guide to the Alice Meynell Collection 1870s at the University of Chicago Special Collections Research Center

1847 births
1922 deaths
Burials at St Mary's Catholic Cemetery, Kensal Green
English essayists
Victorian women writers
British women essayists
English suffragists
Roman Catholic writers
English Roman Catholics
English Catholic poets
Converts to Roman Catholicism
Roman Catholic activists
English women poets
19th-century English non-fiction writers
19th-century English women writers
20th-century English non-fiction writers
20th-century English women writers
Contributors to the Catholic Encyclopedia
Catholic feminists